Tabasalu is a small borough in Harju County, northern Estonia, located about 13 km west from the capital Tallinn. It is the administrative centre of Harku Parish. As of 1 June 2022, the settlement's population was 3,845.

See also
Tabasalu Palliklubi
Tabasalu Bog

References

External links
Harku Parish 

Boroughs and small boroughs in Estonia